Việt Tiến may refer to several places in Vietnam, including:

 Việt Tiến, Haiphong, a rural commune of Vĩnh Bảo District.
 Việt Tiến, Bắc Giang, a rural commune of Việt Yên District.
 Việt Tiến, Hà Tĩnh, a rural commune of Thạch Hà District.
 Việt Tiến, Lào Cai, a rural commune of Bảo Yên District.